The Antimary River, also called the Antimari River, is a river that flows through the states of Acre and Amazonas in Brazil.
It is a tributary of the Acre River.

Course

The Antimary River rises in central Acre and flows in a northeast direction to join the Acre River in Amazonas.
The river flows through the Antimary State Forest in Acre, a  sustainable use conservation unit created in 1997.
In the rainy season it is the only transport route for families living in the state forest, used for carrying Brazil nuts, rubber and cassava flour.

The Antimary River is first mentioned in a 1907 letter by José Plácido de Castro on navigation of the Acre River. 
He described the main geographical points of the Antimary, a tributary of the Acre.
He noted that there were several shacks on the river banks, indicating the presence of rubber tappers.
The fish is now extremely rare in Acre.

See also
List of rivers of Acre

References

Sources

Rivers of Amazonas (Brazilian state)
Rivers of Acre (state)